Bruno Milesi (born 1 February 1965) is an Italian speed skater. He competed in two events at the 1988 Winter Olympics.

References

External links
 

1965 births
Living people
Italian male speed skaters
Olympic speed skaters of Italy
Speed skaters at the 1988 Winter Olympics
Sportspeople from Bruneck